The 2005 PBA All-Star Weekend was the annual all-star weekend of the Philippine Basketball Association (PBA)'s 2005–06 season. This was the first all-star game for the 2005–06 season, as the league is adjusting its season calendar. The events were held at the Ilocos Norte Centennial Arena in Laoag, Ilocos Norte.

Side events

Skills challenge winners
Three-point shootout: Jimmy Alapag of Talk 'N Text, winning over Renren Ritualo of Air21 and Dondon Hontiveros of San Miguel in the finale. Other entries were James Yap of Purefoods, Jeffrey Cariaso of Alaska, Lordy Tugade of Red Bull, Sunday Salvacion of Barangay Ginebra, Dale Singson of Coca-Cola, Ronald Tubid of Air21, and Cesar Catli of Sta.Lucia. 

Trick shot competition: Paolo Hubalde (San Miguel)

Obstacle challenge: Topex Robinson (Red Bull Barako)

Slam Dunk contest: Niño Canaleta (Air21), winning against Enrico Villanueva of Red Bull Barako.

Legends shootout competition: The trio of Alvin Patrimonio, Ronnie Magsanoc and Frankie Lim, won 41–39, over Renren Ritualo, Dondon Hontiveros and Jimmy Alapag.

Rookies vs Sophomores

All-Star Game

Coaches
Ryan Gregorio, coach of the Purefoods Chunkee Giants, and Joel Banal, coach of the Talk 'N Text Phone Pals, were selected as the North and the South head coach, respectively.

Roster

Game

See also
2005–06 PBA season
Philippine Basketball Association
Philippine Basketball Association All-Star Weekend

References

Philippine Basketball Association All-Star Weekend
All-Star
Sports in Ilocos Norte